Who We Are is an EP by American rock band Flyleaf and released on July 9, 2013.
Who We Are is the first Flyleaf release to feature new lead vocalist, Kristen May. "Something Better" is the band's first new song with May.

Track listing
Live tracks from Winter 2013 tour with Drowning Pool.

Personnel
Flyleaf
 Sameer Bhattacharya – lead guitar, backing vocals
 James Culpepper – drums, percussion, timpani, and wind chimes
 Jared Hartmann – rhythm guitar
 Pat Seals – bass, backing vocals
 Kristen May – lead vocals

Additional personnel
 Sonny Sandoval – guest vocals on "Something Better"

Production
 Howard Benson – producer
 Omar Castro – producer

Charts

References

2013 EPs
Flyleaf (band) albums
Albums produced by Howard Benson
A&M Octone Records EPs
Alternative rock EPs
Post-grunge EPs